is a Japanese actor and television presenter best known for his career as General Tani in Takeshi's Castle and Commander Sugata in Hikari Sentai Maskman.

Biography
He was born in Kirishima, Kagoshima, Japan and raised in Sasebo, Nagasaki. He married his first wife in 1971 and married his second wife, Kikko Matsuoka, in 1981, after they appeared in several television shows together. Tani is currently writing a dining guide wherein he discusses maintaining a healthy lifestyle. Tani's roles include General Tani (General Lee in UK and Indian versions) in Takeshi's Castle ("Captain Tenneal" in the U.S. version MXC) and Commander Sugata in the 1987 Super Sentai series Hikari Sentai Maskman. He is also sometimes credited as Hayati Tani.

Filmography

Film
Rampaging Dragon of the North (1966)
Zoku Soshiki Bōryoku  (1967)
School of the Holy Beast (1974), Kenta Aoki

Television
 Key Hunter (1968–73), Tatsuhiko Shima
 Tokugawa Ieyasu (1983), Ōno Harunaga
 Takeshi's Castle (1986–1990), General Tani / Lee
 Hikari Sentai Maskman (1987–1988), Commander Sanjuro Sugata

External links
 

1946 births
Japanese male actors
Living people
Actors from Kagoshima Prefecture